Greg Wojt (born November 22, 1985 in Warsaw, Poland and raised in Mississauga, Ontario) is a former professional Canadian football offensive lineman for the Edmonton Eskimos of the Canadian Football League. He was drafted by the Eskimos in the second round of the 2008 CFL Draft and played four years for the club before being traded to the Hamilton Tiger-Cats. He played college football for the Central Michigan Chippewas. He currently teaches and coaches football at St. Michael's College School.

References

External links
 Edmonton Eskimos bio
 [x Hamilton Tiger-Cats player bio] 

1985 births
Living people
Canadian football offensive linemen
Central Michigan Chippewas football players
Edmonton Elks players
Hamilton Tiger-Cats players
Sportspeople from Mississauga
Sportspeople from Warsaw
Polish emigrants to Canada
Polish players of Canadian football